Marnitz Louis Boshoff (born 11 January 1989) is a South African rugby union player who usually plays as a fly-half or fullback. He also had a short stint with Irish provincial side Connacht in the Pro14.

Rugby career

Youth rugby

Born in Nelspruit in the Mpumalanga province of South Africa, Boshoff is a graduate of Nelspruit Hoërskool and attended the University of Pretoria. He was part of the youth team of Nelspruit-based side the Pumas from 2005 to 2007, before joining the academy of the Pretoria-based Blue Bulls.

Blue Bulls

Boshoff first played at provincial level for the Blue Bulls, playing for them from 2009 to 2011 after coming through their youth side. During his time with the Blue Bulls, he played 24 times, scoring 130 points.

Griquas

In 2012, Boshoff moved to the Griquas. He spent one year there, making 13 appearances and scoring 37 points.

Golden Lions / Lions

He played in both legs of the ' promotion/relegation matches after the 2013 Super Rugby season, which saw the  regain their spot in Super Rugby.

He was the Golden Lions' first-choice fly-half during the 2014 and 2015 Currie Cup competitions, with the Lions reaching the final both times and winning the trophy in 2015, with Boshoff again finishing as the top points scorer.

Connacht

In March 2016, Irish Pro12 side Connacht announced that they secured Boshoff's services on a two-year contract.

Representative rugby

In May 2014, Boshoff was one of eight uncapped players that were called up to a Springbok training camp prior to the 2014 mid-year rugby union tests. Although not initially selected in the 36-man squad, Boshoff was called up to the squad when Damian de Allende suffered a knee ligament injury. He played off the bench against Scotland and scored his first points by converting a try.

He was chosen to represent the Barbarians to face Australia on 1 November 2014 at Twickenham. He came off the bench and scored two conversions and a try, but the Barbarians lost 36–40.

References

External links

itsrugby.co.uk profile

Living people
1989 births
South African rugby union players
Rugby union fly-halves
Rugby union fullbacks
People from Mbombela
Rugby union players from Mpumalanga
Griquas (rugby union) players
Golden Lions players
Connacht Rugby players
Blue Bulls players
Lions (United Rugby Championship) players
Afrikaner people
South Africa international rugby union players